The Baule or Baoulé  (Baule: Baule [ba.u.le];  [bawle]) are a Kwa people and one of the largest ethnicities in Côte d'Ivoire. The Baoulé are traditionally farmers who live in the centre of Côte d'Ivoire (Ivory Coast), in a french braid shaped region (the Baoule “V”) between the rivers Bandama and N'Zi. This area broadly encompasses the regions around the cities of Bouaké and Yamoussoukro. The Baoulé have come to play a relatively important role in the recent history of Côte d'Ivoire: the State's first President, Félix Houphouët-Boigny, was a Baoulé; additionally, since the Ivorian cocoa boom of the 1960-1970s, the Baoulé have also become one of the most widespread ethnicity throughout the country, especially in the Southern forests (the "Low Coast") where they are amongst the most numerous planters of cocoa, rubber, and coffee and sometimes seem to outnumber the local native ethnic groups.

Leisure

One of the favourite pastimes is the game “Atté,” which is similar to the North American version of marbles: Ivorians utilize nuts, not marbles. An odd number of nuts are placed in a circular pattern in the centre of two opposing teams. The two teams, roughly 30 metres apart, take turns throwing nuts at the circle of nuts. Once a nut has been hit, it is eliminated, and the team that hit the respective nut gains a point. The game ends when all the nuts have been eliminated, and the team with the most nuts at the end of the game wins.

Religion

The Baoule religious world consists of three realities :
 Domain of God (Niamien)
 The earthly world: area of human beings, animals and plants, as well as supernatural beings with vast powers who reside in the mountains, rocks, rivers, forests, etc.
 The beyond (blolo) where the spirits of the ancestors reside

Ivorian children

Ivorian children begin aiding their parents with the everyday chores of life at very young ages.  As soon as they are old enough, they either carry water from the village pumps or heavy loads of food and firewood to the village market.  The boys, when old enough, may even help their father with clearing vegetation they also worship the god George court until they were old enough

Like several other groups with Akan origin, Baoulé children are often named according to the day of the week or the circumstances under which they were born.  For example, a male born on a Monday would be named Kouassi.  However, there are slight variations in the spelling and pronunciation specific to the Baoulé. The Baoulé have a calendar that is different from the calendar of other Akan ethnic groups. This may be due to the circumstances of their departure from Ghana and the need for them to mark a separation with the Ashanti Empire. For ethnic groups such as the Ashanti, Abron, N'zima, Koffi may be a name for a boy child born on Friday. For the Baoulé, Koffi and Affoué are names for Saturday, the day being Foué. There is, therefore, a sound common to the day and the names.

Baoulé names:

 Sunday: Kouamé, Amoin; the name of the day is Monnin 
 Monday: Kouassi, Akissi; the name of the day is Kissie
 Tuesday: Kouadio, Adjoua; the name of the day is Djole  
 Wednesday: Konan, Amlan; the name of the day is Mlan
 Thursday: Kouakou, Ahou; the name of the day is Ouwe
 Friday: Yaa, Aya; the name of the day is Yah
 Saturday: Koffi, Affoué; the name of the day is Foue 

Baoule name exceptions

The third girl or boy in a row is named I'nsan (often misspelled N’Guessan), independent of the child's gender.
The 9th child is given the name N'Goran, independent of the child's gender.
The 10th child in the family is always called Brou.
The 11th child from the same mother is called Loukou.
The 12th child from the same mother is called N'Gbin.

Education

Education in Cote d'Ivoire is extremely competitive. Those families that can afford to give their children a private education to assure themselves that their children will receive a formal education. In the public schooling system, to progress beyond certain grade levels children must pass an exam regulated to allow a limited number of passing scores.

Most Ivorian children use a slate to practice their writing and other homework. Small notebooks are also widely available for doing homework and are turned in to be graded. Many homes have a wall with a large chalkboard where children are tutored or practice subjects that they have learned in class. In school, Baoulé children speak only French, but at home they speak their native language of Baoulé. French study begins in grade one.

Handwriting at Ivorian schools is always cursive, never printing.

Baoulé economy

With regard to the Ivorian economy, coffee and cocoa are referred to as the chief cash crop.  Up until the present day conflict, the Côte d'Ivoire was the world's largest exporter of cocoa.  With respect to the local Ivorian economy, resources such as firewood and yams are transported to local markets and sold to other Ivorians or even foreigners.  Within the local marketplace, one can find a wide array of goods, including tailored clothing, boiled eggs, popcorn and lingerie.

Art

The Baoulé people are talented in African art.  Their sculptures are renowned for their refinement, form diversity and the labor they represent. The sculptures do not only include face masks and human figurines, but also include a great variety of work in gold, bronze, and ivory.

Many Baoulé art objects are restricted to be seen only by the individual for whom they were made or by a specific group of people. They are often considered to be powerful spiritual objects. The most powerful spiritual objects are the men's sacred masks, bo nun amuin. This mask is a boxy helmet mask representing a menacing animal with bared teeth. Viewing the mask is restricted to men. If a woman or child sees the mask they risk serious injury or death. It is danced in times of trouble to protect the village and at important men's funerals. When the bo nun amuin mask is danced it can become very wild and violent. The spirit may chase the men through the village or wreak havoc by destroying things in its path.

Another important art object in Baoulé culture is the blolo bla and blolo bian spirit spouse figures. These sculptures are private objects made for an individual to represent their spirit spouse. Each person has a spirit spouse from the other world, which they were married to before they were born into this world. People make offerings of food and money to their spirit spouse figures to keep them happy because they can influence their relationship with their earthly spouse or other earthly relationships and personal endeavors.

Bonu Amuen

The Bonu Amuen is a dance to protect the village from threats and it appears at the commemorations of the deaths of notables. The Baoulé wore a wooden helmet that stands for a buffalo. Then they wore suits with raffia and metal bracelets for the ankles. The snout of the costume has teeth, making it, they believed, a strong animal would defend them.

Other economic activities

 Traditional pagne  (also known as Kente cloth)
 Farming

Baoulé cuisine

The staple food of the Ivorian diet is the yam.  The yam is boiled, and, when cooled, pummeled into a mush to be eaten. Cassava is also an integral part of the Baoulé cuisine. Yams, in addition to corn, are stored until they are needed.  Foods other than yams are obtained from the local market.  The most important food of the market is fish, which is wrapped in palm leaves, an economically efficient alternative to wrapping paper.  Ivorians typically receive their meat from goats, sheep and chickens, which happen to be shared by the entire community.  They receive their milk from their goats and their eggs from their chickens.

Baoulé tools

One of the basic tools employed by the Baoulé populace is the machete.  The machete's uses can include clearing vegetation or the construction of a paddle or canoe from logs.  Another one of the tools employed by the Baoulé populace, is the snail shell, which is used for grounding and pounding tobacco, for the manufacture of snuffs.

Political structure

The Baoulé political structure is simple; several senior village leaders get together and discuss various issues affecting their village.  Each village is ruled by a village-chief (for small villages) or by a queen or a king (for large villages) assisted by some notables or advisers. Queens and kings rarely speak in public, but via a spokesman. Villages were dependent on others to form a canton or a tribe. Each canton is also ruled by a queen or a king. Everyone has a say, even slaves, and everyone was friendly and social. Baoulé political organization is matriarchal and women's rights are very sacred.

See also
Baoulé language
List of cities in Cote d'Ivoire

External links

For spirits and kings: African art from the Paul and Ruth Tishman collection, an exhibition catalog from The Metropolitan Museum of Art Libraries (fully available online as PDF), which contains material on the Baoulé people

 
Ethnic groups in Ivory Coast